Donald Whiston (4 April 1930 – 28 November 2020) was a former footballer who played in the Football League for Crewe Alexandra, Rochdale and Stoke City.

Career
Whiston started his career with his local club Stoke City making his debut for Stoke in the 1949–50 season against Sunderland. He spent eight years at the Victoria Ground where he was used as a utility and backup player and only made a handful of appearances. He left Stoke in 1956 for Crewe Alexandra where he spent two years and then he moved on to Rochdale.

Career statistics
Source:

References

English footballers
Stoke City F.C. players
Crewe Alexandra F.C. players
Rochdale A.F.C. players
English Football League players
1930 births
2020 deaths
Association football midfielders